is a Japanese animation studio founded in October 2000 by former staff of the TMS Entertainment subsidiary Telecom Animation Film and located in Suginami, Tokyo. A unique hallmark seen in many of their works (Ninja Nonsense, Futakoi Alternative, Coyote Ragtime Show, Gakuen Utopia Manabi Straight!, Tales of Symphonia, The Garden of Sinners) is a claymation sequence. Other notable works from the studio include Fate/Zero, Fate/stay night: Unlimited Blade Works, and Demon Slayer: Kimetsu no Yaiba.

Productions

Anime television series

OVAs/ONAs

Anime films

Video games

Tax evasion scandal 
In March 2019, it was reported that a search was performed on Ufotable's offices due to alleged tax evasion. The next month, it was reported that Ufotable owed  in taxes. In June 2020, both the studio and company founder and president Hikaru Kondo were charged with violating the Corporation Tax Act and Consumption Tax Act by failing to pay  (about US$1.28 million) in taxes. The studio published a public statement apologizing for their actions. In July 2021, Hikaru Kondo was formally indicted with evading  (about US$1.24 million) in taxes by the special investigation department of the Tokyo Public Prosecutor's Office. Ufotable acknowledged the indictment and gave assurance that the company had already filed a corrected tax return and paid the appropriate amount. In September 2021, Hikaru Kondo admitted to evading  in taxes at a preliminary hearing by the Tokyo District Court. The prosecution said Ufotable and Kondo hid part of the income from the company's cafes and merchandise from 2015 to 2018 in order to buffer against future downturns in business. In November 2021, it was reported prosecutors were seeking a 20-month prison sentence for Kondo. The court delivered a verdict on December 10, 2021. Kondo was sentenced to 20 months in prison, but the sentence was suspended for three years.

References

External links
 

ufotableWEBSHOP-Global -

 
Animation studios in Tokyo
Japanese animation studios
Japanese companies established in 2000
Mass media companies established in 2000
Nakano, Tokyo